This is a list of African countries by Gross Domestic Product (GDP) per capita based on purchasing power parity (PPP). GDP (PPP) per capita is given in international dollars.

Updated as of July 21, 2021, 8:38 AM MST.

Note that the list excludes overseas departments Mayotte and Réunion (France), both west of Mauritius.

List of African countries by GDP (PPP) per capita

See also
 List of African countries by GDP (nominal)
 List of countries by GDP (PPP) per capita

References

Africa
GDP per capita